The Bologna tramway network was an important part of the public transport network of Bologna, Italy. It was established in 1880 and discontinued in 1963.

On 7 March 2019, the mayor of Bologna revealed plans to build a new citywide tramway network.

As of June 2022, the tender for the executive design and construction of tramway line 1 (red line) has been awarded: the whole line is expected to be operational by 2026. Funding for construction of line 2 (green line) was approved by the Italian Ministry of Infrastructure and Transport in November 2021; activation is also expected by 2026. A further segment of line 2 (blue line) has been announced on 11 December 2021: the planning tender will be launched by the end of 2021, with completion to be expected at a later date than the first two lines.

Future network (2026) 

The reintroduction of a tram network in Bologna is foreseen by the Piano Urbano della Mobilità Sostenibile (PUMS, Italian for Urban Sustainable Mobility Plan), adopted on 27 November 2018. Bologna's PUMS plans the gradual replacement of the main urban bus and trolleybus lines by 4 tram lines:
 Red line: from Borgo Panigale to Centro Agro-Alimentare di Bologna, via Bologna Centrale railway station
 Green line: from Bologna Corticella railway station to Due Madonne/via Larga, via Bologna Centrale railway station
 Yellow line: from Casteldebole railway station to Rastignano railway station
 Blue line: from Casalecchio Garibaldi railway station to San Lazzaro di Savena railway station

As of November 2021, construction of the following tram lines has been fully financed:

Furthermore, the following tram lines (or sections) are in the planning stage:

Line 1 (red) 

Line 1 will have its western terminus at Borgo Panigale Terminal, where a 400-car parking lot is planned, joined with an interchange terminal with intercity bus services. In the opposite direction there will be a double terminus, at the CAAB and at the Michelino parking lot. The main attractors served by the line are Bologna Borgo Panigale railway station, the Maggiore Hospital, the city center, Bologna Centrale railway station, Bologna's Fiera District, the Pilastro district, the Faculty of Agriculture and the CAAB.

Line 1 will feature 34 stops, for a total length of 16.5 km, of which 14.5 km with an overhead contact line; the 2-km tracks in the city center, from Porta San Felice to via Matteotti, won't feature any suspended power line, as the tram will be powered by batteries.

The technical and economic feasibility study for the first line has been carried out by a temporary association of companies formed by Systra, Sotecni, Architecna, Studio Mattioli, Aegis and Cooperativa Archeologia.

The definitive project was published on 25 November 2020. The tender for the executive design and construction was launched on 6 August 2021 and closed on 1 December, receiving four bids.

As of December 2021, the expected timetable is as follows:
 Spring 2022: awarding of the executive project and works
 Autumn 2022: approval of the executive project
 End of 2022: start of the works
 2026: the new tramway line is fully operational.

Line 2 (green) 
Line 2 will have its southern terminus at Via dei Mille, in the city centre. In the opposite direction, the northern terminus will be at Via di Vittorio, in the municipality of Castel Maggiore, where a new parking lot and an interchange terminal for intercity bus services has been envisaged. The main attractors served by the line are Bologna Centrale railway station, the Bolognina district, the Corticella district and Bologna Corticella railway station.

Line 2 will feature 19 stops, for a total length of 7.4 km, of which 4 stops and 1.5 km will be shared with Line 1.

On 30 December 2020, the technical and economic feasibility study for the construction of the second tram line, the green line, was publicly presented to the Navile district mobility committee, with regard to the tram line stretch between the northern terminus (Corticella) and via dei Mille. On 7 January 2021, the municipality of Castel Maggiore mandated the municipality of Bologna to submit a pre-feasibility study to the Italian Ministry of Transport for a further extension of the green line to the center of Castel Maggiore. The joint request for funding, amounting to 222,142,224.26 euros, was sent to the Ministry of Infrastructure and Transport on 14 January 2021.

On 3 November, the Ministry approved the full financing of the new line by Next Generation EU funds, which binds its construction by 2026.

Historical network (1880–1963) 

The first plans for six horsecar lines were approved by the town council in 1877:
 Piazza Vittorio Emanuele-Bologna Centrale railway station
 Piazza Vittorio Emanuele-Porta San Felice
 Piazza Vittorio Emanuele-Barriera Santo Stefano
 Piazza Vittorio Emanuele-Porta Maggiore
 Piazza Vittorio Emanuele-Porta San Mamolo
 Piazza Vittorio Emanuele-Porta Saragozza.

Works on the first stretch, linking Bologna Centrale railway station to Piazza Maggiore, began in September 1880. Service began on Saturday, 2 October 1904.

The first two electrified lines began operating on 11 February 1904.

In 1953, it was decided that, starting from the following year, tramway lines would be gradually discontinued and transformed to bus and trolleybus lines. Service was officially discontinued on Sunday, 3 November 1963, when the last tramway service operated on the last remaining line to San Ruffillo.

Tram Routes of the Old Network (1880-1963)

1902 to 1910 Network

Piazza Vittorio Emanuele-Via Indipendenza-Bologna Centrale railway Station
Piazza Vittorio Emanuele-Piazza del Nettuno-Via Ugo Bassi-Via San Felice-Porta San Felice
Piazza Vittorio Emanuele-Via dell'Archiginnasio-Piazza Galvani-Via Farini-Via Santo Stefano-Località Lo Sterlino
Piazza Vittorio Emanuele-Via d'Azeglio-Palazzina
Piazza Vittorio Emanuele-Porta Saragozza
Piazza Vittorio Emanuele-Porta Zamboni-Sobborgo Sant'Egidio
Piazza Vittorio Emanuele-Porta San Vitale
Piazza Vittorio Emanuele-Porta Lame
Porta San Felice-Scala
Porta Galliera-Stabilimento Tramways della Zucca

1910 to 1932 Network

1 Piazza Vittorio Emanuele-Bologna Centrale railway Station
2 Piazza Vittorio Emanuele-Via D'Azeglio
3 Piazza Vittorio Emanuele-Via Saffi-Scala
4 Piazza Vittorio Emanuele-Mazzini
5 Piazza Vittorio Emanuele-Saragozza
6 Piazza Vittorio Emanuele-Santo Stefano
7 Piazza Vittorio Emanuele-San Vitale
8 Piazza Vittorio Emanuele-Zamboni
9 Piazza Vittorio Emanuele-Lame
10 Piazza Vittorio Emanuele-Zucca
11 Piazza Vittorio Emanuele-Sant'Isaia
12 Piazza Vittorio Emanuele-Castiglione

1932 Network

1 Piazza Vittorio Emanuele-Bologna Centrale railway Station
2 Piazza Vittorio Emanuele-Via D'Azeglio
3 Piazza Vittorio Emanuele-Via Saffi-Scala
4 Piazza Vittorio Emanuele-Mazzini
5 Piazza Vittorio Emanuele-Saragozza
6 Piazza Vittorio Emanuele-Santo Stefano-Sterlino-San Ruffillo
7 Piazza Vittorio Emanuele-San Vitale
8 Piazza Vittorio Emanuele-Zamboni
9 Piazza Vittorio Emanuele-Lame-
10 Piazza Vittorio Emanuele-Zucca-Casaralta
11 Piazza Vittorio Emanuele-Sant'Isaia-Littoriale
12 Piazza Vittorio Emanuele-Castiglione-San Michele in Bosco
15 Piazza Vittorio Emanuele-Corticella
16 Piazza Vittorio Emanuele-Mascarella

Network as of 1943

1 Piazza Galvani-Piazza Vittorio Emanuele-Bologna Centrale railway Station
2 Bologna Centrale Railway Station-Piazza Vittorio Emanuele-Via d'Azeglio
3 Via Montegrappa-Via Saffi-Scala
4 Piazza Re Enzo-Via Mazzini
5 Via Venezian-Porta Saragozza
6 Piazza Vittorio Emanuele-Chiesanuova 
7 Via Venezian-Porta San Vitale
9 Via Montegrappa-Porta Lame
10 Piazza Galvani-Piazza Vittorio Emanuele-Zucca-Casaralta
11 Piazza Cavour-Porta Sant'Isaia-Littoriale
13 Piazza Minghetti-Chiesanuova-San Ruffillo
14 Piazza Galvani-Piazza Vittorio Emanuele-Ippodromo/Mercato Ortofrutticolo
15 Piazza De Marchi-Corticella
17/20 Funivia di San Luca-Piazza Malpighi-Via Roma-Bologna Centrale railway Station
18 Piazza Malpighi-Littoriale-Casalecchio di Reno
19 Piazza Malpighi-Littoriale-Casalecchio di Reno - Connected with Casalecchio-Vignola Railway

Network as of 1952

The post-Second World War period in Bologna caused the change of some road names and some routes merging with other ones. Piazza Vittorio Emanuele Became Piazza Maggiore. The tramway network served San Lazzaro di Savena for the first time.

1/5 Bologna Centrale railway Station-Via Indipendenza-Porta Saragozza
2/8 Via D'Azeglio-Via Zamboni
3 Via Montegrappa-Via Saffi-Scala-Borgo Panigale
4 Via Orefici-Via Mazzini
6 Piazza Maggiore-Chiesanuva
7 Via Orefici-Via San Vitale
9 Via Montegrappa-Porta Lame
10 Via Ugo Bassi-Zucca-Casaralta
11 Via Rizzoli-Stadio Renato Dall'Ara
12 Bologna Centrale railway Station-San Michele in Bosco
13 Piazza Maggiore-Chiesanuova-San Ruffillo
14 Via Ugo Bassi-Ippodromo/Mercato Ortofrutticolo
15 Via Ugo Bassi-Corticella
17 Via Rizzoli-Funivia di San Luca
18 Piazza Malpighi-Casalecchio di Reno
20 Via Orefici-San Lazzaro di Savena

1960-1963 Network

4 Via Orefici-Via Mazzini
6 Piazza Minghetti-Chiesanuova
7 Via Orefici-San Vitale
13 Piazza Minghetti-San Ruffillo (as of 1963, this was the only operating route) - the last tram departure of route 13 was on the 3rd of November 1963, operated by tramcars no. 210 and 218.
20 Via degli Orefici-San Lazzaro di Savena

See also 

 List of town tramway systems in Italy
 History of rail transport in Italy
 Rail transport in Italy
 List of tram and light rail transit systems
 Trolleybuses in Bologna

References

External links 

Bologna
Transport in Bologna
Bologna
Railway lines in Emilia-Romagna
1880 establishments in Italy